Coasters Harbor Island is a  island in Narragansett Bay, Newport, Rhode Island. The island is home to the Naval War College (NWC), an education and research institution of the United States Navy that specializes in developing ideas for naval warfare and passing them along to officers of the Navy.

History
The Native Americans called the island Woonachaset. Colonists purchased Coasters Island from the Indians in 1654. The City built the Newport Asylum for the Poor in 1822.  The Newport Poor House and Farm was located on the island until the City and State donated the island to the U.S. Navy for the Naval War College in 1882. The Navy still uses the island as a training center, and it is home to the Naval War College Museum.

References and external links

Islands of Narragansett Bay
Frederic Denlson, Narragansett Sea and Shore, (J.A. & R.A. Reid, Providence, RI., 1879)
George L. Seavey, Rhode Island's Coastal Natural Areas.

Islands of Newport County, Rhode Island
Islands of Narragansett Bay
Islands of Rhode Island